Patrick Rölli (born 30 October 1972) is a Swiss cross-country skier. He competed in the men's 30 kilometre freestyle mass start event at the 2002 Winter Olympics.

References

External links
 

1972 births
Living people
Swiss male cross-country skiers
Olympic cross-country skiers of Switzerland
Cross-country skiers at the 2002 Winter Olympics
Sportspeople from Lucerne